Dancing on Ice is a British made dance competition television series franchise produced around the world. The format, devised by London Weekend Television and Granada Television for ITV, has been a prime-time hit in eight countries, including Britain and subsequently in Italy and Chile. In Australia, where it was titled Torvill and Dean's Dancing on Ice, it was axed after just one series owing to production costs.

International versions
There have been a total of 51 winners of Dancing on Ice around the world.

All Dancing on Ice series

Argentina
In Argentina, the show was broadcast on Channel 13 as a segment inside the television program "Showmatch", hosted by Marcelo Tinelli. It started on 9 August 2007, featuring an all-female cast. The segment was called "Patinando por un Sueño" (Ice-Skating for a Dream) due to the titles of the other segments: "Bailando por un Sueño" (Dancing for a Dream) and "Cantando por un Sueño" (Singing for a Dream).

Contestants

Jury votes

Note: On week 15, during the performance Natalia had an accident, and she was unavailable to continue, so she became instantly nominated.

 Biggest score.
 Up for eviction and saved by the jury.
 Up for eviction, and saved by the public.
 Up for eviction, and eliminated of the show by the public.
 Replaced by Adabel Guerrero, and had the biggest score.
 Replaced by Adabel Guerrero.
 Replaced by Adabel Guerrero, nominated, and saved by the public.
 Replaced by Virginia Da Cunha.

Jury
The jury was made up of 2 "Celebrity" journalists and 2 personalities:
 Laura Ubfal, a "celebrity" journalist.
 Marcelo Polino, a "celebrity" journalist.
 Reina Reech, a former dancer, a choreographer and an artist director.
 Florencia De La V, a vedette, actress and dancer. Winner and contestant of "Bailando por un Sueño"
The jury's members also studied ice-skating practice and critical theory to support their knowledge.

Australia

Brazil
In Brazil, the show was broadcast on Rede Globo as a segment inside the television program Domingão do Faustão, hosted by Faustão.

It premiered on 13 August 2006 and sparked protests by soap opera directors produced by the broadcaster, after actors who participated in such soap operas were injured in the rehearsals or presentations of the painting.

The competition had three seasons, ending on 25 November 2007.

Murilo Rosa (season 1), Iran Malfitano (season 2) and Leandro Scornavacca (season 3) were the winners of the respective seasons of the competition.

Germany

There are five seasons of Dancing on Ice in Germany aired on different channels.

Italy
The Italian version of Dancing on Ice (Notti sul ghiaccio) was aired on the channel Rai 1.

The Netherlands & Belgium
In September 2006 Dutch broadcaster RTL 4 and Belgian broadcaster vtm started a combined Dutch-Belgian version of Dancing On Ice. The show featured 5 Dutch and 5 Belgian stars, who were paired up with several Dutch, Belgian and foreign ice skaters from Holiday on Ice. The show was hosted by Dutchman Martijn Krabbé and Belgian Francesca Vanthielen.

Contestants

Jury
The jury was made up of 3 Dutch and 2 Belgian experts:
 Katrien Pauwels (Belgium), a former figure skater who represented her country at the 1984 and 1988 Winter Olympics.
 Thierry Smits (Belgium), a world-renowned choreographer.
 Jeroen Prins (Netherlands), a former figure skater and currently a judge at international figure skating events. His former coach was Joan Haanappel.
 Joan Haanappel (Netherlands), a former figure skater who is a three time bronze medallist at the European Championships. She represented the Netherlands at the 1956 and 1960 Olympics, where she finished 13th and 5th respectively.
 Sjoukje Dijkstra (Netherlands), the 1964 Olympic Champion of Figure Skating. She also won the silver medal at the Olympics of 1960, as well as gold in 5 European Championships and 3 World Championships.
During RTL4-VTM's broadcast of the Dutch-Belgian version of Dancing on Ice, the Dutch broadcaster SBS6 broadcast a similar programme called Sterren Dansen Op Het IJs (translation: Stars are Dancing on Ice). The show, which ran from August–October 2006 was hosted by Nance Coolen and Gerard Joling. The winner was Hein Vergeer, a former World Champion of speedskating. Singer Jody Bernal came second and former Dutch Idol runner-up Maud Mulders took the bronze. The SBS-show featured only Dutch stars and drew a bigger audience than its Dutch-Belgian counterpart.

Netherlands
In 2007, a second series of Dancing On Ice aired in the Netherlands. This time the stars were all Dutch (except Dieter Troubleyn, who is Flemish, but known in the Netherlands).

Contestants

Martijn Krabbé returns to present the show. John Williams (contestant of the first series) will co-host. Joan Haanappel and Sjoukje Dijkstra return in the jury. Chris de la Haye is a new member of the jury.

Revival
A third series was re-commissioned for the 2019-2020 season by SBS6 in the Netherlands, following a deal with ITV Studios Global Entertainment. The first show in the series was broadcast on December 7, 2019, hosted by Winston Gerschtanowitz and Patty Brard. The members of the judging panel were Marc Forno, Joan Haanapel and Ruben Reus.

Participants 
Not in order of elimination

Norway
In 2007 the first series of Isdans aired in Norway.

Contestants

Poland - Gwiazdy tańczą na lodzie
Jury
Maria Zuchowicz,
Igor Kryszyłowicz,
Doda,
Włodzimierz Szaranowicz.

First edition
First Polish edition started on 28 September 2007  on TVP2

Second edition
Second Polish edition started on 7 March 2008  on TVP2

Third edition

Third Polish edition started on 3 October 2008  on TVP2.

Russia
The Russian version of Dancing on Ice (Танцы на льду) was being aired on Rossiya TV channel since September 2006, and was renamed in 2008 to Star Ice (Звёздный лёд). Its counterpart called Ice Age (Ледниковый период, initially Stars on Ice - Звёзды на льду) was being broadcast on Channel One.

Season 1

Slovakia
The Slovak version of Dancing on Ice (Hviezdy na ľade) is aired since September 2006 on TV JOJ.

Turkey

First Edition
The Turkish version of Dancing on Ice is called Buzda Dans (Dance on Ice) started on 8 January 2007 on Show TV. The final was broadcast on 11 March 2007. The winner Zeynep Tokuş received a golden skate shoe trophy and a prize of TRY 100,000 (approximately US$ 71,000 ).

Contestants

Hosts
 Behzat Uygur (son of Nejat Uygur and brother of Süheyl Uygur)
 Gamze Özçelik (actress and model)

Jury
The first version of the Turkish version of the show had 2 ice skating experts, and 4 amateurs in the jury.
Figure-skating experts were:
Zafer Baykal
Cenk Ertaul
The other jury members were:
Ayşe Arman (journalist)
Olcayto Ahmet Tuğsuz (journalist)
Alinur Velidedeoğlu (advertiser)
Sema Çelebi (society member)

Second Edition 
The Turkish version of Dancing on Ice called Buzda Dans (Ice Dance) was repeated for a second season in 2007/2008 Winter. The jury members who are not experts of ice dance were Olcayto Ahmet Tuğsuz, Hande Ataizi, Ahmet San and Sema Çelebi. The experts in the jury were Cenk Ertaul and Şebnem Ertaul. The winner of the show was former football player İlhan Mansız, the runner-up was actress Yasemin Hadivent. The partner of Mansız was Oľga Beständigová.

United Kingdom

United States

A U.S. adaptation, Skating with Celebrities, aired for a single season on Fox in 2006.

A similar series, Skating with the Stars, aired on ABC in 2010, but was produced by BBC Worldwide as a spin-off of Dancing with the Stars.

References

External links 
Australian version
German version
Netherlands & Belgium version
Russian version
Slovakian version
UK version

Dancing on Ice
Figure skating on television
Figure skating in Argentina
Figure skating in Germany
Figure skating in Belgium
Figure skating in the Netherlands
Figure skating in Norway
Figure skating in Poland
Figure skating in Russia
Figure skating in Slovakia
Figure skating in Turkey
Television franchises